General elections were held in the British Virgin Islands on 2 June 1971. The result was a victory for a coalition of the VI Democratic Party (DP) together with independent candidate Willard Wheatley over the newly formed Virgin Islands Party (VIP) led by former Chief Minister Lavity Stoutt, and incumbent BVI United Party (UP) led by Conrad Maduro.

Prior to the election Stoutt had was serving as Chief Minister and leader of the UP, but due to internal divisions Stoutt left and formed his new party to contest the election against the UP and the DP, but ended up losing and being replaced by Wheatley as Chief Minister.

The election was also notable for the first female candidate in a British Virgin Islands election: Millicent Mercer contested the 5th District on behalf of the VIP, but lost to Conrad Maduro.

In the 7th District the former representative, Robinson O'Neal, had died in a car crash the prior year.

Results

By constituency

Appointments
Following the election:
Willard Wheatley was appointed Chief Minister and Minister for Education
Oliver Cills was appointed Minister for Communications, Works and Industry
Q.W. Osborne was appointed Minister for Natural Resources and Public Health
Lavity Stoutt became the Leader of the Opposition

References 

Elections in the British Virgin Islands
British Virgin
General election
June 1971 events in North America
British Virgin
Election and referendum articles with incomplete results